Gold City is an American southern gospel quartet based in Gadsden, Alabama. Formed in 1980, the group was one of the most successful quartets through the 1980s and 1990s, charting ten number one hits in Singing News magazine and being host to many icons in the Christian music industry, including Brian Free, Ivan Parker, Mark Trammell, Mike LeFevre, and Tim Riley.

History

1980s
The Mississippi-based Christianairs group were renamed Gold City in Dahlonega, Georgia at midnight on New Year’s Day in 1980, composing of tenor Bob Oliver, lead Jerry Ritchie, baritone Ken Trussell, and bass Dallas Gilliland. Bass Tim Riley would replace Gilliland as the permanent bass singer in July of that same year. The group appeared on the main stage of the National Quartet Convention in October 1981. Pianist Garry Jones joined the group one month prior to the convention. In 1982, tenor Brian Free came on board and lead Ivan Parker joined in 1983. This group of men formed a consistent core that remained together until the end of 1993. Original owner Floyd Beck died in 1984, resulting in Tim Riley taking over ownership and the group's relocation to Gadsden, Alabama. Jeff Hullender joined the group in 1984 as the group's bass guitar player. Mike LeFevre joined in 1985 to sing the baritone part, replacing Jerry Ritchie.

1990s
Steve Lacey took over for LeFevre in 1992, and after the departure of Free, Jones, and Parker in 1993, Lacey switched to lead while Mark Trammell became baritone and Jay Parrack was named the new tenor. Lacey left to join the Kingdom Heirs the following year. David Hill became lead singer for a while; his departure led to the next consistent lineup for the group, which included Jonathan Wilburn singing lead, Mark Trammell singing baritone, and Jay Parrack as tenor with Riley at bass from 1996 until 2002. Over this period, the group developed a style that relied on heavy brass arrangements for their more driving songs.

2000s
Trammell left the group in 2002 to form his own Mark Trammell Trio. In 2004, the group saw the departure of Parrack at tenor in addition to the retirement of Tim Riley after 24 years. former Brian Free & Assurance bass singer Bill Lawrence replaced him as bass, while Riley's sons, drummer Doug and baritone Daniel, took over management of the group until Doug Riley died in an automobile accident in early 2006. By this point, the full Gold City band had been retired and replaced with accompanying tracks.

In March 2006, bass singer Bill Lawrence left the group. Tim filled in for several months while the search for a replacement was underway. Aaron McCune, who was bass singer with the Palmetto State Quartet at the time, joined Gold City in May 2006.

In February 2007, it was announced that the group had returned to The Beckie Simmons Agency (from The Harper Agency). Beckie Simmons, while at Century II and her own agency, has handled the quartet's bookings for the majority of its existence.

In March 2008, lead singer Jonathan Wilburn left the group. Bruce Taliaferro, a Gadsden native who had filled in for Wilburn and Daniel Riley in the past, stepped in to fill the empty position. Gold City released their first recording with Taliaferro in July 2008. Also, August 2008 saw the Band of Gold return to the scene on a limited basis. The band consisted of pianist Josh Simpson, drummer Kevin Albertson, bass guitarist Taylor Barnes, and lead guitarist Daniel Addison.

On April 28, 2009, tenor, Steve Ladd, announced that he would be leaving Gold City. On June 17, 2009, it was announced that Chris Cooper would be filling the tenor position. It was announced in July 2009 that Josh Simpson would be leaving Gold City in August to go to college. His temporary replacement was Curtis Broadway who played on Band of Gold dates. Gold City Bus driver Jim Korn filled in on keys after the Band of Gold quit traveling with the group. It was announced on August 11. 2009 that Aaron McCune had departed Gold City and a replacement was being sought.

Later in December, it was announced that Chris Cooper left Gold City and a replacement would be found by the end of Christmas break. Over the Christmas break, it was announced that former Legacy Five tenor Josh Cobb would be joining the group, and former Ernie Haase & Signature Sound pianist Roy Webb would join as the pianist. It was also announced that Tim Riley would be committed to full-time traveling with Gold City.

2010s to present
Later in 2010,  Roy Webb opted to leave the group to fully pursue a solo career. Josh Simpson filled in on the piano while a new pianist was found. After the National Quartet Convention, it was announced that Perry's pianist, Bryan Elliott, would be filling the piano bench.  Months later, tenor singer, Josh Cobb was released from the group for logistical reasons. On October 29, Brent Mitchell was announced as tenor, to start officially November 11, 2010. Bruce Taliaferro announced his resignation the next month on December 18, 2010. Tim Riley would retire again in 2014 to be replaced by bass Chris West.

On January 28, 2020, Bruce Taliaferro announced his return to the group, after the resignation of lead singer Scott Brand. Bruce began singing with the group on February 21. On January 11, 2022, Taliaferro announced his second resignation from the group, effective immediately until his replacement by Gadsden native Cole Watson. Watson and seven year tenor Thomas Nalley were released by the quartet nine months later. In the Fall of 2022, Gold City announced the third return of Bruce Taliaferro. On the same night he was re-introduced, they also announced Former Kingsmen Quartet tenor Chris Jenkins as their new tenor singer.

Members (past and present)

Line-ups

Musicians

Band of Gold

Larry Goddard, pianist (1980); bassist (1980–82)
David Holloway, steel guitarist (1980–82)
Wayne Hussey, drummer (1980–82)
Cary Kirk, bassist (1980)
John Reinhardt JR, pianist (1980–81)
Garry Jones (1981–82, 1983–94)
Jeff Easter, bassist (1981–82)
Jerry Lloyd, steel guitarist (1982–1984,1985–86)
John Noski, drummer (1982,1983–87)
Ken Bennett, bassist (1982–84)
Rodney LaShaum, pianist (1982–83)
Olan Witt, drummer (1982–83)
Daryll LeCroy, steel guitarist (1984)
Kelly Back, guitarist (1984)
Corbett Harper, drummer (1984)
Jeff Hullender, bassist (1984–88)
Daryll LeCroy, steel/lead guitarist (1986–1993)
Doug Riley, drummer (1989–2005); sound engineer (2005–06)
Barry Scott, bassist (1989)
Mark Fain, bassist (1989–95)
David Brooks, pianist (1994–95)
Adam Borden, bassist (1995–2005)
Shane Jenkins, pianist (1995–96)
Randy Matthews, pianist (1996–97)
Byron Stewert, pianist (1997)
Tim Parton, pianist (1997–99)
Channing Eleton, pianist (2000–06)
Josh Simpson, pianist (2005–09)
Curtis Broadway, pianist (2009)
Roy Webb, pianist (2009–10)
Bryan Elliot, pianist (2010–18)
G.W. Southard, pianist (2018–22)

Discography

1981: First Day in Heaven
1981: We Believe
1981: Sing Golden Nuggets
1981: Songs of Days Gone By
1982: I've Got a Feeling
1982: Gold City: Live
1983: I Think I’ll Read It Again
1983: Hymns Sung by The Gold City Quartet
1983: Higher than the Moon
1984: Walking with Jesus
1984: Walk On
1985: Sing with the Angels
1986: Double Take: Live
1986: "Top Hits Volume 1"
1986: "Top Hits Volume 2"
1986: Your Favorite Hymns
1987: Movin’ Up
1987: Favorites Volume 1
1987: Favorites Volume 2
1987: Favorites Volume 3
1988: Portrait
1988: Voices of Christmas
1989: Chartbreakers Volume 1
1989: Chartbreakers Volume 2
1989: Favorite Hymns Volume 2
1989: Goin’ Home
1990: Windows of Home
1990: Instrumentals Volume 1
1990: Chartbreakers Volume 3
1990: Indiana Live
1991: Super 70s Gospel Hits Vol. 1
1991: Super 70s Gospel Hits Vol. 2
1991: Super 70s Gospel Hits Vol. 3
1991: 10 Year Celebration
1991: Answer the Call
1992: Pillars of Faith
1993: Acapella Gold
1993: Requested Hymns Volume 1
1993: Requested Hymns Volume 2
1993: Requested Hymns Volume 3
1994: Renewed
1994: Lord Do It Again
1994: Classics
1995: Standing in the Gap
1996: Having Fun
1996: Preparing the Way
1997: What a Great Lifestyle
1997: Home for the Holidays
1998: Within the Rock
1999: Signed, Sealed, Delivered
2000: Amazing Grace: A Hymn Collection
2000: 20th Anniversary Celebration: Vol. 1
2000: 20th Anniversary Celebration: Vol. 2
2000: Are You Ready?
2001: Pressed Down, Shaken Together, Running Over
2002: Camp Meetin' 
2003: Walk the Talk
2003: A Gold City Christmas
2004: First Class
2005: Heaven
2006: Revival
2008: Moment Of Truth
2010: A Collection of Favorites Volume 1, Version 1
2011: A Collection of Favorites Volume 1, Version 2
2011: Somebody's Coming
2014: Hymn Revival
2016: Authentic
2017: "Treasures of Gold"
2018: "Hope for the Journey"
2021: "Once And For All - The Songs Of Doug Riley"

Compilations

1986: Gold City Gold
1990: Favorites Volume 4
1992: Masters of the Gospel
1992: Kings Gold
1993: Kings Gold 2
1994: Kings Gold 3
1996: Kings Gold 4
1998: The Collection
2000: Through the Years
2002: The Very Best of Gold City
2003: 24K Gold
2006: Gold City — Their Best
2009: 7 Hits

References

External links

 Gold City Tribute & History Website
Southern Gospel History: Gold City

American gospel musical groups
Gospel quartets
Musical groups established in 1980
Musical groups from Alabama
Musical groups from Georgia (U.S. state)
Southern gospel performers
Musicians from Gadsden, Alabama